American Family Field is a retractable roof stadium used primarily for baseball. It is located in Milwaukee, Wisconsin, just southwest of the intersection of Interstate 94 and Brewers Boulevard. It is the home of Major League Baseball's Milwaukee Brewers, and opened in 2001 as a replacement for Milwaukee County Stadium. The stadium was previously called Miller Park as part of a $40 million naming rights deal with Miller Brewing Company, which expired at the end of 2020.

American Family Field features North America's only fan-shaped convertible roof, which can open and close in less than 10 minutes. Large panes of glass allow natural grass to grow, augmented with heat lamp structures wheeled out across the field during the off-season.

Construction
American Family Field was one of the largest construction projects in Wisconsin history. It was built with US$290 million of public funds from a 0.1% sales tax that began January 1, 1996, and ended on March 31, 2020. The tax was applied on purchases in Milwaukee County and four surrounding counties: Ozaukee, Racine, Washington, and Waukesha. The tax was controversial, in part because of the notion of using public funds for a privately owned sports team. The state senator who cast the deciding vote in the funding bill, George Petak of Racine, lost a recall election based on his vote for the stadium.

On November 9, 1996, groundbreaking took place in a parking lot behind County Stadium. Originally scheduled to open in 2000, American Family Field's construction was delayed after three construction workers were killed in an accident on July 14, 1999. A Lampson Transi-lift crane (nicknamed "Big Blue") brought in to build the roof collapsed while lifting a 450-ton roof section during windy conditions. A camera crew was filming construction of the stadium on that day and captured the collapse on video as it occurred. Repair work and an investigation forced the Brewers to stay in County Stadium for one more year, until 2001. There was some talk of having the Brewers move to American Family Field in the middle of 2000, but it was determined that too many issues would need to be resolved for it to be a realistic possibility.

The stadium has a retractable roof, built in a unique fan-shaped style, with the roof panels opening and closing simultaneously in a sweeping manner from the first- and third-base sides toward center field. The complex and massive roof was a significant factor in the $392 million cost of the stadium. It allows the seating area to be heated  warmer than the outside temperature when closed, allowing games to be played in inclement weather and in more comfortable conditions than an open-air stadium. For example, when it is freezing outside, the temperature inside will be . The idea of the stadium having a retractable roof had been considered right away in the initial design, as to help counter the unpredictable Wisconsin weather in the early spring and late autumn.

The design team was appointed after a design competition in the mid-1990s. The architectural concept for the stadium was developed by the Los Angeles-based sports and entertainment team NBBJ, who worked closely with a Los Angeles-based team of engineers Arup, who were responsible for all stages of the structural and building services engineering design for the stadium, with the exception of the mechanical mechanisms that move the roof structure. The original versions of these mechanisms were designed by Mitsubishi Heavy Industries America as part of a design and build contract, but they have now been replaced by new designs after their failure. The executive architect responsible for the delivery of the final stadium design was a Dallas-based team of HKS, Inc. In addition to these major players there were a significant contributions from local teams including Eppstein Uhen Architects.

The stadium design followed the trend of retro-designed ballparks with current amenities that began in 1992 with Oriole Park at Camden Yards in Baltimore.

The original grass playing surface was installed on March 10, 2001, using County Stadium's surface infield dirt and home plate transplanted into the new stadium.

The stadium was previously called Miller Park as part of a $40 million naming rights deal with Miller Brewing Company which expired at the end of 2020. Madison-based American Family Insurance purchased the naming rights in a new 15-year deal.

Structural challenges
The unconventional fan-shaped retractable roof has not been without complications. Major elements of the pivot system behind home plate and the outfield roof track have been replaced, even after the crane incident.

At the end of the 2006 season, the roof's bogie system was replaced at a cost of over $13 million. The 10 new,  bogies were paid for with money from the settlement between the stadium district and Mitsubishi Heavy Industries of America. Six of the bogies weigh , while the four others weigh . "The bogies will last for the life of the facility," said Mike Duckett, executive director of the then named Miller Park stadium district. The project was completed by the start of the 2007 season.

Another issue resulting from the design of the roof and the adjacent large glass panels is that, during day games when the roof is fully open, shadows cover home plate and the batters boxes, while the pitchers mound is in full sunlight. This was a safety concern for batters, and was addressed during the 2010 season, when it was determined a larger shadow would cover both home plate and the pitchers mound if only one half of the roof was opened. This tactic has since been discontinued.

Additions
In time for the 2006 season there were three additions to the stadium. Two sets of LED scoreboards were added. One replaced the formerly manually operated "out of town" scoreboards along the left and right field walls with a new set of LED scoreboards along the left-field wall. The new "out of town" scoreboards show the score of every Major League game on that day. A second-tier marquee scoreboard was also added along the bottom of the 300-level of the stadium stretching from foul pole to home plate to foul pole, with the portion closest to the foul lines used to provide open captions of announcements from the public address system and advertisements. The section of the second-tier scoreboard above home plate displays statistics for those unable to see the main scoreboard above the center-field wall. The final addition to American Family Field for the 2006 season was the addition of a field-level picnic area in the corner of right-field. The picnic area has a capacity of 75 and provides a place for fans to watch the game in a leisurely setting and be within feet of the right-fielder. Known first as the Mercedes-Benz Field Haus, the picnic area's name was changed to AirTran Airways Landing Zone in 2009, and to the ATI Club in 2012. In 2017, due to a contract dispute between ATI and the Brewers, it was apparently billed as the Right Field Patio until gaining its current sponsorship as the Aurora Health Care Bullpen in 2018.

During the 2007 season, as the Brewers got closer to the team record of home runs in a season, a home run counter was added to the right of the center field scoreboard. In the shape of a gas pump, the counter was sponsored by Citgo, whose name could be seen as a play on words for a home run (C-It-Go). The counter kept track of the home runs hit by the Brewers during the season and when a home run was hit, the player's name was shown on the display as well as the distance of the home run. The Citgo home run counter was removed after the 2009 season.

Early into the 2008 season, the Brewers also added a sponsored strikeout counter to the tier of the second deck of the right field bleachers, which illuminates a K when a Brewers' pitcher notches a strikeout and keeps track of how many strikeouts as a team the Brewers have.  Prior to this addition, Bernie Brewer would hang strikeout K's from the railing of his club house, including backwards K's to denote a called strike three.

In 2009, American Family Field's outfield was replaced with "Lo-Mo" Kentucky bluegrass just like the infield was the prior year. The new turf, common in other ballparks around baseball, is denser and has a sand base, instead of the sand and clay mix under the original grass. The turf yields truer hops and fewer instances in which the baseball skips under an outfielder's glove than the previous turf. Also for the 2009 season, the Harley-Davidson Deck was opened on the field level of the stadium in left-center field.

During the off-season between 2010 and 2011, the stadium's original centerfield scoreboard (a smaller videoboard atop a larger black and amber message display board) was replaced by a full-length and full color Daktronics 1080p HD display board which is the ninth-largest screen among current MLB stadiums, along with a public address/sound system upgrade.

Attendance

From the year American Family Field opened in 2001, the Brewers have averaged 31,783 fans per game, or 2,574,423 per season, while placing 11th out of 30 franchises in total attendance, despite having only eight winning seasons through the 2019 season, and having won only two MLB playoff series in just five total series appearances, and having the smallest market size of any Major League city. In 2011, the Brewers set a franchise record of 3,071,373, and beginning in 2004 they have attracted at least two-million fans; an ongoing streak of 15 consecutive years, the 12th longest in Major League history. Prior to American Family Field, the previous such consecutive streak in Milwaukee baseball history was four years, from 1954 to 1957. Since 2007, the Brewers have drawn at least 2.5 million in attendance to American Family Field in 12 of 13 seasons.. 

Note: For the 2020 season, fans were not allowed in MLB stadiums due to the COVID-19 pandemic. For part of 2021, fans were allowed to attend, but with reduced capacity.

Attractions

 Bernie Brewer, the team mascot, has a club house above the left field seats. Following every Brewers home run and victory, Bernie Brewer slides into a home plate shaped platform (The Kalahari "Splash Zone" was discontinued for the 2012 season). This is different from his old home at Milwaukee County Stadium, where Bernie slid into a giant mug of beer in center field which had been sponsored over the years by Pabst, Miller, and Sentry Foods. During the home run celebration, a short burst of fireworks is shot out from the top of the center field scoreboard, and above Bernie's club house, the call words of Brewers' radio announcer Bob Uecker are illuminated, "Get Up, Get Up, Get Outta Here, Gone!"
 The Hank the Dog mascot made his debut on September 13, 2014. Hank the real dog was found wandering the field at the Spring training complex in Maryvale, Arizona on February 17, 2014. He was named after former Brewer and Braves great Hank Aaron. He would soon become an international sensation.
 The Barrelman mascot made his debut on April 6, 2015. The barrelman served as the team's primary logo from 1970 to 1977.
 The Johnsonville Sausage Race occurs during each game in the middle of the 6th inning; it was moved from the bottom of the 6th inning to enable the sausages to create more excitement for the fans as the Brewers prepared to bat. The current "racing sausages" are the Bratwurst, the Polish, the Italian, the Hot Dog and the Chorizo. The chorizo sausage (to salute the region's growing Latino population) was added on July 29, 2006 for one race, and became a full-time participant in 2007.
 During the 7th inning stretch, in addition to "Take Me Out to the Ballgame", fans at American Family Field sing "Roll Out the Barrel", in salute to Milwaukee's beer-making history.
 The Brewers have also set statues of legendary Milwaukee players Robin Yount and Hank Aaron outside the front entrance of American Family Field, as well as a statue of former team owner and MLB commissioner Bud Selig and one for Brewers longtime radio broadcaster Bob Uecker.
 Another sculpture, Teamwork by Omri Amrany, honors three Iron Workers Local 8 members killed during the construction of the stadium.
 Helfaer Field is a youth baseball facility located outside American Family Field. The infield is laid out upon the former footprint of the County Stadium infield, albeit in smaller Little League-compliant dimensions. The groundbreaking ceremony was held in August 2001. It was named in honor of the Evan and Marion Helfaer Foundation, which was founded in 1974. Evan Helfaer was an original investor in the Brewers.
 The American Family Field Walk of Fame was created in 2001 to honor both the Milwaukee Brewers and the Milwaukee Braves. It is located outside American Family Field on the plaza near the home plate entrances. Former Brewer pitcher Teddy Higuera became the 18th honoree in August 2015.
 The Brewers Wall of Honor was created in 2014 to commemorate Brewers players, coaches and executives who meet a set criteria based on service to the club or career accomplishments. It is located outside American Family Field on an exterior wall near the Hot Corner entrance. Brewers TV announcer Bill Schroeder became the 59th honoree on July 17, 2015.
 The Selig Experience is an exhibit to honor former Brewers owner and retired MLB commissioner Allan H. (Bud) Selig. It opened on May 29, 2015.

Notable events

Baseball

On opening day April 6, 2001, President George W. Bush and MLB Commissioner Bud Selig had first pitch honors for the stadium. The park hosted the 2002 MLB All-Star Game, which ended infamously in a tie.

Non-Brewer games
In April 2007, snow storms in northern Ohio caused the Cleveland Indians to postpone their home opening series against the Seattle Mariners and forced the Indians to find a different location for their home series against the Los Angeles Angels of Anaheim. Major League Baseball took advantage of American Family Field's roof and moved the Indians-Angels series to Milwaukee. All seats were sold for $10 apiece, and attendance was 52,496 for the three games. The series was a reminder to many of the 1989 film Major League, which featured scenes filmed in Milwaukee County Stadium, though the film was about a fictionalized Cleveland Indians team. The first game of the series was played on the same day that the film's "Wild Thing Edition" was released on DVD. When Joe Borowski came in to close for the Indians, the song "Wild Thing" was played over the PA system, in an homage to the film. Also, the Indians' mascot Slider slid down Bernie Brewer's slide following Indians home runs. These games were the first to be played under American League rules in Milwaukee since 1997 (the Brewers' final season in the AL), and have been the only games played under AL rules in American Family Field.

Hurricane Ike's landfall in Houston forced the Chicago Cubs and Houston Astros to play a two-game series at American Family Field on Sunday, September 14 and Monday, September 15, 2008. The park became the first neutral site in Major League history to host a no-hitter, when Carlos Zambrano of the Chicago Cubs threw the first no-hitter in the history of the park against the Houston Astros on Sunday, September 14, 2008. The next day, his teammate Ted Lilly, took a no-hitter into the 7th inning.

On Sunday, September 13, 2020 Chicago Cubs pitcher Alec Mills threw the second no-hitter in American Family Field history during the pandemic shortened 2020 season. The no-hitter, against the home Milwaukee Brewers, came in just Mills' 14th career major league start.

Bowling
American Family Field hosted the 2007 United States Bowling Congress Masters finals on Sunday, October 28, 2007. The playing surface was fitted with four bowling lanes for the tournament.

Concerts

Soccer
During the 2014 All-Star break, American Family Field hosted an untelevised international friendly match between Swansea City and Chivas of Guadalajara on July 16, 2014. The soccer pitch was laid out in a first baseline-to-left field configuration, with a narrower width than a standard soccer pitch due to the constraints of the field. The teams played to a 1–1 draw in front of about 31,000 in attendance.

During the 2015 All-Star Break, American Family Field hosted a friendly between Mexican side Club Atlas and English Premier League side Newcastle United on July 14, 2015.  Club Atlas won the match 2–1.

After a three-year hiatus, American Family Field once again hosted a friendly match between Mexican sides C.F. Pachuca and Club León.  Pachuca won the match 3–1.

Movie premiere
On August 11, 2012 American Family Field hosted an event called "Field of Honor: A Salute to the Greatest Generation". Over 30,000 tickets were sold for the event, which included the premiere showing of Honor Flight, a documentary detailing the Honor Flight movement, where veterans of World War II are flown into Washington, D.C. on commercial flights via donations and non-profit organizations in order to visit the National World War II Memorial in person. The promoters were hoping to best a world record for a movie premiere attendance, previously held for the premiere in Brazil of a soccer film.

Arctic Tailgate
The Arctic Tailgate is an annual event where fans camp outside American Family Field the day before single game tickets are sold, which is usually the last weekend of February. (It is delayed or moved into the stadium's heated concourse if the temperatures are well below  for the safety of fans.) The tradition is said to have started as early as the 1990s where Brewers fans would try to be the first to acquire tickets for Opening Day. Since 2006, the Brewers have made it an official event, even providing the waiting fans coffee, hot chocolate, and doughnuts in the morning, discounts on tickets for the first week of games in the season, as well as a free lunch consisting of a hot dog, chips, and a soda, eaten in a heated tent afterwards.  Over 101,000 tickets were sold for the 2015 Arctic Tailgate.

In film
American Family Field was also a major filming location for the motion picture Mr. 3000, which centered on a fictional Brewers player played by comedian Bernie Mac.

Climate

Photo gallery

See also
 List of baseball parks in Milwaukee
 List of NCAA Division I baseball venues
 Teamwork, a memorial sculpture at the stadium
 Selig Monument, a sculpture in tribute to Bud Selig

References

External links

 American Family Field
 Southeast Wisconsin Professional Baseball Park District

2001 establishments in Wisconsin
Baseball venues in Wisconsin
Leadership in Energy and Environmental Design certified buildings
Major League Baseball venues
Milwaukee Brewers stadiums
NBBJ buildings
Retractable-roof stadiums in the United States
Sports venues completed in 2001
Sports venues in Milwaukee